The Pains of Growing Tour was the second concert tour by Canadian singer and songwriter Alessia Cara, staged in support of her second studio album, The Pains of Growing (2018). The tour began on May 11, 2019, in Ottawa, and concluded on November 20, 2019, in Houston.

Background and development
On February 1, 2019, Cara announced that she would embark on a 12-date Canadian tour in support of her second album, The Pains of Growing. Ryland James was announced as the opening act. With dates in May, she avoided conflicts with Shawn Mendes: The Tour, with whom she was the opening act. 

In July, Cara announced that she would be releasing an EP, This Summer, and that she would be embarking on a US leg of the tour, performing 18 shows across the country. Ryland James was announced to be returning as the opening act, although Cara's tour guitarist Craig Stickland filled in as the opening act for one show in Prior Lake, Minnesota.

Setlist 
This setlist is representative of the show on October 21, 2019, in Boston. It does not represent all the shows from the tour.

"Growing Pains (Reprise)"
"Growing Pains"
"Here"
"Ready"
"Not Today"
"Feeling Good"
"Comfortable"
"Girl Next Door"
"A Little More"
"I Don't Want To"
"Rooting for You"
"7 Days"
"Nintendo Game"
"How Far I'll Go"
"Out of Love"
"What's On Your Mind?"
"Okay Okay"
"Scars to Your Beautiful"
"October"
"Stay"
"Growing Pains (Reprise)"

Tour dates

Cancelled shows

References

Alessia Cara
2019 concert tours